Matthew Jarvis may refer to:

 Matt Jarvis (born 1986), English association football player
 Matthew Jarvis (poker player), Canadian poker player
 Matt Jarvis (psychologist) (born 1966), psychology education lecturer at Keele University
 Matthew Jarvis (rugby union) (born 1990), Welsh rugby union player